Adrián Israel García Arías (born 6 December 1975) is a Mexican former footballer and manager who last played as a defender for Celaya of Mexico, and managed Michoacán F.C., a team that plays in Liga TDP. He is currently manager for Liga Nacional club Malacateco.

Club career
García Arias played in some of the most important teams of Mexico, including Querétaro.

International career
In 2002, García Arias played two games with Mexico at the 2002 CONCACAF Gold Cup.

References

External links
 

1975 births
Living people
Footballers from Mexico City
Association football central defenders
Mexican footballers
Mexico international footballers
Deportivo Toluca F.C. players
Club América footballers
Santos Laguna footballers
Chiapas F.C. footballers
San Luis F.C. players
Indios de Ciudad Juárez footballers
Atlético Morelia players
Querétaro F.C. footballers
Club Celaya footballers
Liga MX players